Philippe Biane (born 1962) is a French mathematician known for his contributions in probability theory and group representation. He was awarded the Rollo Davidson Prize in 1995, together with Yuval Peres.

References

External links 
 Website at Université Paris-Est

1962 births
Living people
20th-century French mathematicians
Probability theorists